Kamsdorf is a village and a former municipality in the district Saalfeld-Rudolstadt, in Thuringia, Germany. Since July 2018, it is part of the municipality Unterwellenborn.

History
Within the German Empire (1871–1918), Kamsdorf was part of the Prussian Province of Saxony.

References

Former municipalities in Thuringia
Saalfeld-Rudolstadt